Poland’s Holocaust: Ethnic Strife, Collaboration with Occupying Forces and Genocide in the Second Republic, 1918–1947 is a  1998 book by sociologist Tadeusz Piotrowski. It concerns the topic of Poland's history in the interwar period as well as in World War II, with particular focus on the uneasy relations between various ethnic groups of the Second Polish Republic.

Content 
The book discusses the suffering of Polish citizens under Nazi and Soviet military terror and analyses how Polish Jews, ethnic Poles, Belorussians, Lithuanians, and Ukrainians in the Polish territories resisted or cooperated with the occupying forces. It includes tables, maps, primary source documents and a bibliography.

Reception 
Klaus-Peter Friedrich writing in Zeitschrift für Ostmitteleuropa-Forschung considers the methodology in Poland's Holocaust to be questionable. Friedrich writes that the book is critical towards ethnic minorities in Poland and apologetic towards ethnic Poles. Overall, Friedrich considers the work to be "unbalanced" as Piotrowski "considers collaboration exclusively under ethnic terms as if it was ethnically determined".

Anna M. Cienciala reviewed it for Nationalities Papers also in 2001. Her review was likewise positive, describing the work as "a solid study of the suffering, resistance, and collaboration."

Adele Valeria Messina devoted a chapter to Piotrowski's book in her work American Sociology and Holocaust Studies: the Alleged Silence and the Creation of the Sociological Delay.  She places Piotrowski's book between the works of Celia Stopnicka Heller and Jan T. Gross as an important voice in understanding what the Holocaust in Poland was. According to Messina, Piotrowski shows how the nationalist policies of the Polish government before the war and the national ambitions of minorities led to a split and the outbreak of ethnic conflicts after the start of the World War Two. Ethnic minorities turned to collaboration with the occupying powers and against the interests of the Polish state. Piotrowski emphasize the role of collaboration of all national groups as an important factor contributing to the extent of the extermination of Jews in Poland. Messina highlights Piotrowski's effort to document through the voices of witnesses both Polish collaboration and the assistance offered to persecuted Jews.

Further reading

See also 
The Forgotten Holocaust

References 

1998 books
History books about Poland
History books about World War II
History books about interwar Europe
History books about the Holocaust